Ğäbdennasír İbrahim ulı Qursawí, sometimes spelled Kursavi or Koursavi (1776–1812) was a Tatar educator,  Hanafi Maturidi theologian, and prominent Jadidist. He was a brother of Ğäbdelxaliq Qursawí. He studied at Machkara (Malmyzhsky District) village madrassah and later at the Mir-i-Arab Madrasah in Bukhara. From 1794 to 1808 he was imam of the mosque in Yughary Qursa village of Kazan Governorate, Russian Empire and the headmaster of his own madrassah. His surname is, actually, a derivative of "Qursa" in Arabic manner, which means "from Qursa". He is credited with the revival of modernism- and reform-oriented Islam (or Jadidism) among the Tatars, and was the author of numerous articles about religion. He died during the hajj and is buried in Istanbul.

References

Hanafis
Maturidis
1776 births
1812 deaths
History of Tatarstan
Muslims from the Russian Empire
Tatar people of Russia
18th-century imams
19th-century Islamic religious leaders
Jadids